Scott Christopher Harlow (born October 11, 1963) is an American retired professional ice hockey left winger who played one game in the NHL with the St. Louis Blues during the 1987–88 NHL season. Harlow was selected in the 3rd round (61st overall) of the 1982 NHL Entry Draft by the Montreal Canadiens.

He also played in the AHL, IHL, and later in the BHL. He is currently the amateur scout of the Boston area of the Edmonton Oilers.

Awards and honors

Head coaching record

See also
List of players who played only one game in the NHL

References

External links

1963 births
Living people
AHCA Division I men's ice hockey All-Americans
American men's ice hockey left wingers
Baltimore Skipjacks players
Boston College Eagles men's ice hockey players
British Hockey League players
Edmonton Oilers scouts
Ice hockey players from Massachusetts
Maine Mariners players
Montreal Canadiens draft picks
New Haven Nighthawks players
People from East Bridgewater, Massachusetts
Peoria Rivermen (IHL) players
Phoenix Roadrunners (IHL) players
St. Louis Blues players
Sherbrooke Canadiens players
Sportspeople from Plymouth County, Massachusetts
Stonehill Skyhawks men's ice hockey coaches